Martin Tenhove (born 20 August 1959) is a Canadian sailor. He competed in the 470 event at the 1984 Summer Olympics.

References

External links
 

1959 births
Living people
Canadian male sailors (sport)
Olympic sailors of Canada
Sailors at the 1984 Summer Olympics – 470
Sportspeople from Hamilton, Ontario